Timothy or Tim Green may refer to:
Timothy P. Green (born 1963), politician
Timothy Green II, comic book artist
Tim Green (born 1963), sportscaster

See also
The Odd Life of Timothy Green, a 2012 film
Timothy Greene (disambiguation)